Disley is a civil parish in Cheshire East, England. It contains 56 buildings that are recorded in the National Heritage List for England as designated listed buildings.  Of these, one is listed at Grade II*, the middle grade, and the others are at Grade II.  Apart from the village of Disley, the parish is rural.  The Peak Forest Canal, and the River Goyt run through the parish.  There are four listed bridges associated with these waterways, three over the canal, and one over the river.  Lyme Park lies mainly in the adjacent parish of Lyme Handley, but two of its entrances lie within Disley parish, including listed lodges and gate piers.  Otherwise, most of the listed buildings are houses, cottages, farmhouses and farm buildings.  The other listed items include a church and associated structures, public houses, a drinking fountain, a war memorial, a milestone, and a telephone kiosk.

Key

Buildings

See also
Listed buildings in Stockport
Listed buildings in New Mills
Listed buildings in Lyme Handley

References
Citations

Sources

 

Listed buildings in the Borough of Cheshire East
Lists of listed buildings in Cheshire